Holiday Heroes is a Bulgarian non-profit association helping socially disadvantaged families, elderly people, single mothers and people with disabilities, by delivering foodstuffs at their homes.

History 
Holiday Heroes was launched in Bulgaria in 2012. It was initiated by Michael Straumietis, owner of Advanced Nutrients company. Charity campaigns take place at Christmas and Easter each year. The aim of the initiative is to support in need families, elderly people, single parents and persons with disabilities with the help of celebrities and big companies. It also addresses people living outside Bulgaria. The association's slogan is "Love in Action."

Promotion 
The Holiday Heroes team provides regular information on every step of ongoing campaigns through active online presence, especially via the initiative's profiles on Facebook, YouTube, Instagram, and Pinterest.

Holiday Heroes campaigns are supported by Bulgarian media, including: bTV, the Bulgarian National Television (BNT), Nova TV, The Voice Radio &TV, TV7, the Bulgarian National Radio (BNR), Darik Radio, BG Radio, Manager magazine, the newspapers Standard and Monitor, Hello! Bulgaria, and many more.

Fundraising 
Holiday Heroes was established in Bulgaria as a response to the relatively underdeveloped corporate culture of donation. The major part of the financial and in-kind aid to the initiative is provided exactly by companies operating in Bulgaria.

This NGO is sponsored by different international and local companies.

Holiday campaigns 
List of campaigns and number of families included:
 Christmas 2012 – 1,000 families 
 Easter 2013 – 2,000 families
 Christmas 2013 – 5,000 families
 Easter 2014

Representatives 
Sports people: The national rhythmic gymnastics team, CSKA volleyball club, Ivan Zarev.

Musicians: Ruth Koleva, Orlin Pavlov, Billy the Kid, Mihaela Fileva, Bobo, Vicky Terziyska, Yoko Zahariev, Yoana Dragneva, Ice Cream, Kuts & Klets, Spens, D-Flow, Tony, Svetlin Kaslev, Santra, Redman, Veselin Marinov, Anelia, Tedi Katsarova, Vyara Atova.

Actors: Antoni Argirov, Kalin Vrachanski, Ani Mihaylova, Sasho Kadiev, Koyna Ruseva, Bashar Rahal, Stefan А. Shterev, Alexander 'Silver' Sano, Deyan Donkov, Nevena Bozukova-Neve, Milica Gladnishka, Ivaylo Zahariev, Katya Evro, Yoanna Temelkova, Anne Schedeen. 

Others: Georgi Milkov, Yana Grudeva, Dilyana Popova, Yuliyan Kostov, Thomas Lafchis, Mira Dobreva, Mihail Dyuzev, Irina Tencheva, Borisa Tyutyundzhieva, Mira Dobreva, Martina Vachkova, Asya Metodieva, etc.

Supporting events 
Holiday Heroes organize a series of supporting events. Those range from holiday workshops, art bazaars, and charity auctions of items and personal belongings of local celebrities to sports tournaments (board games, billiards and bowling), high profile charity gala dinners and concerts.

References

Non-profit organizations based in Bulgaria